Carine Senior High School is a public co-educational high day school, located in the suburb of Carine, approximately  north-west of Perth, Western Australia.

History
Carine Senior High School was established in 1973 and reached senior high school status three years later. It caters for around 1,500 students from Years 7 to 12, and offers a range of tertiary, non-tertiary and vocational education and training (VET) subjects in Years 11 and 12.

In 2017 Carine Senior High School was awarded WA Secondary School of the Year.

House system
In 2017 Carine SHS reinstated a house system with the following colours:

Catchment area 
The Carine Senior High School catchment area consists of students living in Carine, Waterman's Bay, North Beach, Karrinyup, Gwelup, Trigg, Marmion, parts of Duncraig (south of Warwick Road) and small areas of Sorrento, Innaloo, Doubleview, Scarborough and Balcatta.

The primary schools within the catchment area are Carine Primary School, Davallia Primary School, Poynter Primary School, Marmion Primary School, North Beach Primary School, Karrinyup Primary School, Lake Gwelup Primary School, Deanmore Primary School and Newborough Primary School.

Notable alumni
 Darren Glass - West Coast Eagles footballer
 Jamie Harnwell - Perth Glory FC captain
 Lisa McCune - Gold Logie-winning actress
 Guy McKenna - West Coast Eagles footballer 
 Mark Nicoski - West Coast Eagles footballer 
 Jo Beth Taylor - former TV actor starring in multiple shows
 Mitchell White - West Coast Eagles footballer

See also

 List of schools in the Perth metropolitan area

References

External links

 Carine Senior High School website

Educational institutions established in 1973
Public high schools in Perth, Western Australia
1973 establishments in Australia